Bradford Township is one of twenty-two townships in Lee County, Illinois, USA.  As of the 2010 census, its population was 324 and it contained 124 housing units.  Ashton Township (originally called Ogle Township) was formed from part of Bradford Township on February 12, 1861.

Geography

Cemeteries
The township contains these two cemeteries: Bradford and Gehant Farm.

Airports and landing strips
 Gittleson Farms Airport

Demographics

School districts
 Ashton Community Unit School District 275

Political districts
 Illinois's 14th congressional district
 State House District 90
 State Senate District 45

References
 
 United States Census Bureau 2009 TIGER/Line Shapefiles
 United States National Atlas

External links
 City-Data.com
 Illinois State Archives
 Township Officials of Illinois

Townships in Lee County, Illinois
1849 establishments in Illinois
Townships in Illinois